Ayodele Joseph Oritsegbubemi Oritsejafor, known as Papa Ayo Oritsejafor, is the founding and Senior Pastor of Word of Life Bible Church, located in Warri, Nigeria. He became the national president of the Pentecostal Fellowship of Nigeria (PFN) on 7 February 2005, a position he held for five years. In July 2010, Oritsejafor was elected President of the Christian Association of Nigeria(CAN), the apex body of all Christians in the country. In doing so he became the first Pentecostal leader to hold the position. Oritsejafor was the first to launch a Miracle crusade from Africa to a world audience via satellite in 1987 with evangelist Joe Martins.

Early life

Ayo Oritsejafor was born on November 10 into the family of Mr. Joseph Monday Oritsejafor and Mrs. Roli Durojaiye Oritsejafor in Lagos, Nigeria. His mother is a staunch member of the  Christ Apostolic Church (CAC).

In 1972, Oritsejafor became “born again” in an evangelical crusade held in Sapele, Nigeria. Oritsejafor enrolled at the All Nations For Christ Bible Institute, Benin City, Nigeria.

Oritsejafor further enrolled with the Nigerian Baptist Seminary, Ogbomosho in Oyo State, Nigeria and later proceeded in 1979 to the United States for further studies at Morris Cerullo's School of Ministry (El Cortez), San Diego, California.

According to him, he had a vision of himself wearing a suit and was preaching to thousands of people and he heard a voice that said to him, “this is what you are going to be doing the rest of your life” and the voice said, “Take my word to the world”. This is the inaugural vision that led to the founding of the Word of Life Bible Church (WLBC) in November 1987. He hosts Hour of Deliverance, a television program which had its debut in 1980.

Oritsejafor says he owes all his life's accomplishments to God, and his success in ministry he attributes to the influence of God-given mentors like Archbishop Benson Idahosa, Dr. Morris Cerullo, Evangelist Robert W. Schamback, and Evangelist Tommy L. Osborn amongst others.

Oritsejafor is a proponent of leadership by example. This is evident in the role he played in bringing the crisis in Niger Delta area of Nigeria to an end.

Philanthropy

Oritsejafor sees himself as a servant of God and an instrument through which the God ministers to the spiritual and physical needs of people. He places emphasis on salvation, repentance, holiness, deliverance and empowerment of the less privileged, through social responsibility programmes. Over the years, he has condemned wastefulness and encouraged giving back to the society, regardless of religion or race. He offers scholarships to indigent students in various tertiary, secondary and elementary institutions both within and outside Nigeria irrespective of tribe or denomination.

In December 2005, Oritsejafor and his wife Helen partnered with Flight Micro Finance Bank to start an empowerment programme for the people. Oritsejafor, ever since, makes it a tradition to empower the less privileged and to alleviate the sufferings of families all over at the end of every December.

On 26 December 2016, the Word of Life Bible Church in conjunction with the Eagle Flight Micro Finance Bank held the poverty alleviation programme in Warri.

African Broadcasting Network (ABN)
Oritsejafor set up African Broadcasting Network, an international satellite Christian television station intended to serve as a voice for the gospel of Christ from Africa to the world. ABN is a satellite channel broadcasting from London, with a coverage that spans across the whole of Africa, parts of Asia and parts of Europe. ABN is currently viewed in 75 countries world-wide and online via WebTV.

Recognition

Oritsejafor has received several awards both internationally and locally in regards of his various peace and humanitarian initiatives. He has been honored with the Golden key to the City of Kalamazoo, Michigan by the mayor of the city. He was also honored with the International Youth Ambassador for Peace Award. He was conferred an Officer of the  Order of the Federal Republic (OFR) one of the Nigerian National Honours at the International Conference Centre, Abuja on December 22, 2008. Oritsejafor received an award of 'A True Servant of God' by The Northern States Christian Elders Forum (NOSCEF) May 9, 2013. Speaking on the choice of Oritsejafor, the Chairman of NOSCEF, Matthew Owojaiye said:

Christian Association of Nigeria, (CAN)

In 2010, Oritsejafor was declared the National President of the Christian Association of Nigeria (CAN). He has been called the "most misunderstood" President of CAN. He was re-elected as the president on July 10, 2013. In an interview with a CAN Official, he lauds Oritsejafor:

Oritsejafor came up with the idea of a Jubilee Centre to generate funds for the association: a 50–bedroom structure with a huge conference hall. The Jubilee Centre, National Christian Center, Abuja, was completed and opened in 2015 by President Goodluck Jonathan .

Criticism

Oritsejafor has been heavily criticized. After he was elected as the National President of CAN, an association not well recognized by Nigerians attracted headlines because of Oritsejafor's defense of the Church in Nigeria, freedom and equality, and terrorism.

Sources articulated that Oritsejafor's only crime was to lead Nigerian Christians in calling upon the US Congress to label a "group of young men" a terrorist group in his testimony before a committee of the US Congress in 2012.

In 2014, the "group of young men" was not only labeled as a terrorist group but an International Terrorist Organization that have taken over 5000 innocent lives alongside massive territory damages since mid-2009. The Global Terrorism Index said the group has killed more people: 6,644—in terror attacks during 2014 than any other terrorist group.

Those who knew the good intentions of Oritsejafor towards the well-being of the citizens of Nigeria stood up against all  critics.

Books
Oritsejafor has authored several books: 
Walking in Unity
Breaking the Power of Yesterday
The Non-Essentials
The Stone That Killed Goliath
How to get answers to unanswered prayers
Power through the Church
The Battle is in the Mind
Be an Over-Comer
Power for the Journey
Faith Antidote for Daily Living
A Voice in the Wilderness
A Man amongst Men
The Altar
God can not lie
  Eaglets Devotional

References

Bibliography

External links

Official Website

Officers of the Order of the Federal Republic
Living people
Nigerian writers
Nigerian Pentecostal pastors
Christian Association of Nigeria Presidents
Nigerian television evangelists
Year of birth missing (living people)
People from Warri